Júlio Botelho, also known as Julinho (29 July 1929 – 10 January 2003) was a Brazilian football player. He was primarily a right winger. Known for his dribbling ability and powerful shot, Julinho is regarded as one of the greatest wingers in football history. He was selected by Eric Batty in the World Soccer Magazine world XI in 1960.

Club career
Julinho was born in São Paulo. During his career (1951–1967), he played for Portuguesa, Fluminense and Palmeiras. In Italy, he was a team member of Fiorentina and was a key member of the squad which won the Italian title in 1956. In 1957, he participated in the club's 1957 European Cup Final, a 2–0 loss to Real Madrid.

International career
Julinho played for Brazil at the 1954 FIFA World Cup in Switzerland, scoring two goals. He was also a member of the squad that won the 1952 Panamerican Championship, and that finished runners-up in the 1953 South American Championship and the 1964 Taça das Nações. In total, he made 24 international appearances between 1952 and 1965, scoring 11 goals.

Style of play
A highly creative, talented, and dynamic player, with a slender build, Julinho usually played as a right winger, where he operated as a playmaker, and was known for his speed, vision, tactical sense, powerful shooting ability, and dribbling skills, which enabled him to cut into the centre and shoot on goal or create chances for other players. He was also known for his ability to build attacking plays, or get to the touchline and deliver accurate curling crosses to his teammates. He is regarded as one of the greatest players of all time, and as one of Brazil's best wingers ever.

After retirement
Julinho was nominated the best player in the history of Fiorentina in 1996.

Death
He died at the age of 73 on 10 January 2003.

Honours

Club
Portuguesa
 Torneio Rio-São Paulo: 1952, 1955

Fiorentina
 Serie A: 1955–56
 European Cup: Runner-up 1956–57

Palmeiras
 Campeonato Paulista: 1959, 1963
 Campeonato Brasileiro Série A: 1960
 Torneio Rio-São Paulo: 1965
 Copa Libertadores: Runner-up 1968

Individual
 World Soccer Magazine World XI: 1960
 Brazilian Football Museum Hall of Fame
 Inducted in ACF Fiorentina Hall of Fame

References

External links
 
 

1929 births
2003 deaths
Brazilian footballers
ACF Fiorentina players
Fluminense FC players
Sociedade Esportiva Palmeiras players
1954 FIFA World Cup players
Brazil international footballers
Brazilian expatriate footballers
Expatriate footballers in Italy
Serie A players
Association football forwards
Footballers from São Paulo